Nord Pool AS is a pan-European power exchange. Nord Pool has a main office in  Oslo and further offices in Stockholm, Helsinki, Tallinn, Berlin and London. The company is owned by the European exchange operator Euronext as well as TSO Holding, which represents the continental Nordic and Baltic countries' transmission system operators (TSOs: Fingrid, Energinet, Statnett, Svenska Kraftnät, and Litgrid). Nord Pool has two subsidiaries, Nord Pool AB and Nord Pool Finland Oy.

History

1932-1991: Norwegian origins

In 1971 the exchange merged with the regional exchanges in other parts of Norway, and became  (literally the Coordination of Power Stations in Norway), with 118 power companies as members as of 1988.

1991-2000: Nordic deregulation and integration
In 1991 the Norwegian parliament decided to deregulate the market for power trading. In 1993 Statnett Marked AS was established as an independent company.

In 1996, the Swedish electricity market was also deregulated. Statnett Marked AS was subsequently replaced by Nord Pool ASA, owned in equal parts by the Swedish and Norwegian transmission system operators (TSOs), Svenska Kraftnät and Statnett. This contributed to the unification of the two countries' electricity markets.

Finland as well as western and eastern Denmark joined Nord Pool ASA in 1998, 1999 and 2000, respectively.

2000-present: Expansion in Europe

In 2000, Nord Pool ASA participated in establishing the Leipzig Power Exchange (now part of the European Energy Exchange). Nord Pool also supplied its technology to France's Powernext exchange.

On 27 December 2001, Nord Pool ASA's spot market (derivatives and physical energy markets) activities were spun off into a new company, Nord Pool Spot AS. The remaining parts of Nord Pool ASA were later acquired by Nasdaq, and are presently known as Nasdaq Commodities.

In 2005, Nord Pool Spot AS started trading and clearing of European Union (EU) emission allowances, becoming the first exchange to expand its activities into this area. The company expanded its activities to Germany by opening the KONTEK bidding area.

On 12 January 2010, Nord Pool Spot AS in cooperation with Nasdaq Commodities launched the N2EX power market in the United Kingdom.

On 2 February 2010, Nord Pool Spot signed an agreement with the Estonian national grid company Elering to create the Nord Pool Spot Estlink bidding area starting from 1 April 2010. Nord Pool Spot also delivered the technical solution for the Lithuanian market place Baltpool. On 9 June 2010, APX-ENDEX, Belpex and Nord Pool Spot agreed to create a cross-border intraday electricity market based on Nord Pool Spot's Elbas technology. Today, the common intraday market includes the Nordic countries, the Baltic countries, Germany, the Netherlands, and Belgium.

In 2012, Nord Pool Spot opened a bidding area in Lithuania, and in 2013 the Latvian market was opened.

On 20 January 2016, Nord Pool Spot AS was rebranded to Nord Pool AS.

On 27 August 2019 Nord Pool started trading in France, Germany, Luxembourg, Belgium, Austria and the Netherlands, the result of a European Union decision to allow several power exchanges to operate in the same markets, increasing competition.

On 5 December 2019 Euronext announced that it would acquire 66% of Nord Pool. The acquisition was completed on 15 January 2020.

See also

Other pan-European exchanges
 European Energy Exchange
 European Power Exchange
 Euronext
 Nasdaq Nordic

Related technology companies
 European Market Coupling Company
 European Network of Transmission System Operators for Electricity (ENTSO-E)
 European Network of Transmission System Operators for Gas (ENTSO-G)
 Council of European Energy Regulators (CEER)
 European Regulators' Group for Electricity and Gas (ERGEG)

Regulations and agencies
 Regulation on Wholesale Energy Market Integrity and Transparency
 Agency for the Cooperation of Energy Regulators
 Energy Community

Notes

References

External links
Nord Pool AS website

Euronext markets
Electric power exchanges in Europe
Companies established in 2002
Companies based in Oslo
Electricity markets
Electric power in Norway
Electric power in Denmark
Electric power in Sweden
Electric power in Finland
Electric power in Estonia
Electric power in Lithuania
Energy in Europe
2002 establishments in Norway
Nordic energy market